Bulelwa Tinto is a South African politician. A member of the African National Congress, Tinto is from Cape Town, Western Cape Province. She is a member of the National Assembly of South Africa and does not sit on any parliamentary committees.

References

Year of birth missing (living people)
Living people
Politicians from Cape Town
African National Congress politicians
Members of the National Assembly of South Africa
Women members of the National Assembly of South Africa